Nikulino is a rural locality (a selo) in Dobryansky District, Perm Krai, Russia. The population was 284 as of 2010. There are 8 streets.

Geography 
Nikulino is located 62 km northeast of Dobryanka (the district's administrative centre) by road. Kulikovo is the nearest rural locality.

References 

Rural localities in Dobryansky District